Shimazu is a Japanese surname. Notable people with the surname include:

 Esther Shimazu (born 1957), American/Hawaiian sculptor
 Saeko Shimazu (born 1959), Japanese voice actress
 Shimazu clan, daimyō of the Satsuma han
 Shimazu Hisamitsu (1817-1887), Japanese samurai prince
 Shimazu Katsuhisa (1503-1573), the fourteenth head of the Shimazu clan
 Shimazu Nariakira (1809-1858), Japanese feudal lord (daimyō)
, Japanese footballer
 Shimazu Tadahisa (died 1227), founder of the Shimazu clan
 Shimazu Tadatsune (1576-1638), Tozama daimyō of Satsuma
 Shimazu Tadayoshi (1493-1568), daimyō (feudal lord) of  Satsuma
 Shimazu Takahisa (1514-1571), daimyō  during Japan's Sengoku period
 Shimazu Toshihisa (1537-1592), senior retainer to the Shimazu clan
 Shimazu Yoshihiro (1535-1619), general of the Shimazu clan
 Shimazu Yoshihisa (1533-1611), daimyō  of Satsuma
 Takako Shimazu (born 1939), Japanese princess
 Yasujirō Shimazu (1897–1945), Japanese film director

Japanese-language surnames